Hans Föllmer (20 May 1941 in Heiligenstadt, Thuringia, Germany) is a German mathematician, currently professor emeritus at the Humboldt University of Berlin, visiting professor at the National University of Singapore, and Andrew D. White Professor-at-Large at Cornell University. He was awarded the Cantor medal in 2006. In 2007 he became doctor honoris causa at the Paris Dauphine University.

Hans Föllmer is widely known for his contributions to probability theory, stochastic analysis  and mathematical finance.

In mathematical economics, he made early contributions to the mathematical modeling of social interactions.

In mathematical finance,  he made  fundamental contributions to the theory of risk measures and the hedging of contingent claims.

Main scientific works

References 

20th-century German mathematicians
21st-century German mathematicians
Academic staff of ETH Zurich
1941 births
Living people
Probability theorists